Shivadhoothi ("She who sent Shiva as an emissary") is a manifestation of the Hindu mother goddess Shakti.

The Devi Mahatmyam relates how, during the battle against the demons Sumbha and Nisumbha, Shivadhoothi emerged from the body of the goddess Chandi and ordered Shiva to deliver an ultimatum to the demons that if they did not surrender they would be devoured by her jackals. Along with her ferocious appearance, Shivadhoothi's laugh was so loud that it terrified the enemy asuras, whom she then devoured.

In the Kalika Purana, Shivadooti is described as having a dark complexion, with long matted hair, three eyes, and holding a scimitar, while her right foot rests on the back of a jackal and her left foot tramples a corpse of a demon. She possesses ten incarnations (Yoginis): Kshemankari, Shantaa, Devamata, Mahodari, Karali, Kamada, Bhagasya, Bhagamalini, Bhagavaha, and Subhaga.

References

Hindu goddesses
Mother goddesses
Forms of Parvati
War goddesses
Shaktism